Li Jong-un (born 10 March 1936) is a North Korean rower. He competed in the men's coxless pair event at the 1972 Summer Olympics.

References

1936 births
Living people
North Korean male rowers
Olympic rowers of North Korea
Rowers at the 1972 Summer Olympics
Place of birth missing (living people)